Little Wills Valley is a valley in the U.S. state of Alabama. It was named after Chief Little Wills, a Native American.

References

Valleys of Alabama
Landforms of DeKalb County, Alabama
Landforms of Etowah County, Alabama
Alabama placenames of Native American origin